The Marion Oilworkers were a minor league baseball team based in Marion, Ohio and Marion County, Ohio. In 1903 and 1904, the Oilworkers played as members of the Class B level Central League, while hosting home minor league games at Webb Park. In 1904, the Oilworkers relocated to and from Peoria, Illinois during the season.

History
Marion, Ohio first hosted minor league baseball in 1900, when the Marion "Glass Blowers" team played a partial season as members of Class B level Interstate League. The Glass Blowers finished in seventh place before the league folded following the season. 

In 1903, the Marion "Oilworkers" resumed minor league play, as the team became charter members of the eight-team, Class B level Central League.The Anderson Orphans, Dayton Veterans, Evansville River Rats, Fort Wayne Railroaders, South Bend Green Stockings, Terre Haute Hottentots and Wheeling Stogies joined Marion in beginning Central League play on April 30, 1903.

The "Oilworkers" nickname for the team corresponds to industrial oil digging efforts that took place in the era.

In their first season of play, Marion placed third in the Central League. The Oilworkers ended their initial Central League season with a record of 71–65, playing the season under manager John Grim. Marion finished 17.0 games behind the place first place Fort Wayne in the final regular season standings, as the league held no playoffs.

The Marion Oilworkers continued play in the 1904 Central League, before relocating and returning during the same season. 

On May 29, 1903, one day before the team relocated, pitcher/infielder Jim Hackett threw a two-hit shutout against the Fort Wayne Railroaders, winning 3-0. Hackett was attempting a comeback after losing eyesight due to a poison ivy related infection in 1903 that left him hospitalized for over two months.

The next day, on May 30, 1903, Marion moved to become the Peoria Distillers, with a 12-15 record. After compiling a 27-33 record while based in Peoria, the franchise returned to Marion on July 24, 1904, and played the remainder of the season as the Oilworkers, finishing in sixth place. Overall, the Marion/Peoria team compiled an overall record of 61-75 and finished 25.5 games behind the first place Fort Wayne Railroaders in the final standings of the eight-team league. The Oilworkers were managed by the returning John Grim and Mike Lawrence during their final season.

The Marion Oilworkers did not return to the 1905 Central League and were replaced by the Springfield Babes franchise in league play.

The Oilworkers were succeeded in minor league play by the 1906 "Marion" team that played a partial season in the Class B level Interstate Association and the 1906 and 1907 Marion Moguls of the Class C level Ohio-Pennsylvania League.

The ballpark
The Marion Oilers hosted minor league home games at Webb Park. The ballpark had a capacity of 800 and was located in Marion.

Timeline

Year-by-year records

Notable alumni

John Grim (1903-1904, MGR)
Jim Hackett (1904)
Tom Letcher (1903-1904)
Ted McGrew (1904)
Dave Pickett (1903)
Owen Shannon (1904)

See also
Marion Oilworkers players

References

External links
Marion - Stats Crew
Marion - Baseball Reference

Defunct minor league baseball teams
Professional baseball teams in Ohio
Defunct baseball teams in Ohio
Baseball teams established in 1903
Baseball teams disestablished in 1904
Marion, Ohio
Marion County, Ohio
Central League teams